Melvyn Richardson (born 31 January 1997) is a French handball player for FC Barcelona and the French national team. He is the son of retired French handball player Jackson Richardson.

Achievements

Club
EHF Champions League:
Winner: 2018 and 2022
Supercopa Ibérica:
Winner: 2022

International
World Championship:
Bronze Medalist: 2019
Junior World Championship:
Bronze Medalist: 2017
Youth World Championship:
Gold Medalist: 2015
Youth European Championship:
Gold Medalist: 2014

Individual 
 All-Star Right Back of the Youth European Championship: 2014
 MVP of the Youth World Championship: 2015
 Best young player of the LNH Division 1: 2017

References

External links

1997 births
Living people
Sportspeople from Marseille
French male handball players
Montpellier Handball players
FC Barcelona Handbol players
Handball players at the 2020 Summer Olympics
Medalists at the 2020 Summer Olympics
Olympic gold medalists for France
Olympic medalists in handball